The 1994 NCAA Division I Men's Swimming and Diving Championships were contested in March 1994 at the University Aquatic Center at the University of Minnesota in Minneapolis, Minnesota at the 71st annual NCAA-sanctioned swim meet to determine the team and individual national champions of Division I men's collegiate swimming and diving in the United States.

Stanford again topped the team standings, finishing 121.5 points ahead of Texas. It was the Cardinal's third consecutive and seventh overall title and the sixth for coach Skip Kenney.

Team standings
Note: Top 10 only
(H) = Hosts
(DC) = Defending champions
Full results

See also
List of college swimming and diving teams

References

NCAA Division I Men's Swimming and Diving Championships
NCAA Division I Swimming And Diving Championships
NCAA Division I Men's Swimming And Diving Championships
NCAA Division I Men's Swimming and Diving Championships